Maryse Lassonde  (born January 5, 1954) is a Canadian academic and neuropsychologist.

She holds the Canada Research Chair in Developmental Neuropsychology at the Université de Montréal and the University Hospital Center Sainte-Justine researching brain disorders.

In 1993, she became President of the French Canadian Association for the Advancement of Sciences (ACFAS). In 1999, she was made a Knight (Chevalier) of the National Order of Quebec. In 1994, she was made a Fellow of the Canadian Psychological Association and in 1997, she became a fellow of the Royal Society of Canada. She has received several awards, including the Marcel Vincent Prize (ACFAS) in 1998, the Noeil Mailloux Prize (Quebec Order of Psychologists, 2001) and the Adrien Pinard Prize (Quebec Association for Research in Psychology, SQRP, 2008).  She was made an Officer of the Order of Canada (OC) in June 2012.

External links
 National Order of Quebec citation 

1954 births
Canada Research Chairs
Canadian psychologists
French Quebecers
Fellows of the Royal Society of Canada
Knights of the National Order of Quebec
Living people
People from Saint-Jean-sur-Richelieu
Academic staff of the Université de Montréal
Officers of the Order of Canada
Canadian women psychologists